Legnano, an Italian municipality of the Metropolitan City of Milan in the Alto Milanese, has a recorded history from the first mention of the  to the present day.

During the Middle Ages, Legnano was the site of an important battle wherein the Lombard League defeated Frederick Barbarossa. Because of that battle, Legnano is the only city other than Rome, capital of Italy, to be mentioned in the national anthem.

Industry has had significant impact on Legnano's history and the municipality remains one of the most developed and industrialized in Italy.

Geological history

From the Paleozoic to the Cenozoic Eras, the area to be Legnano was below sea level. The primordial ocean blanketed the municipal area in many different layers of sediment. The largest factor in the creation of Legnano's geography is the glaciation in northern Italy during the Quaternary period. It was during this period that the fertile alluvial plain of the Po Valley was formed by glaciers and later the rivers of the Alps and Prealps. In the Legnano area, the Olona river was the executor of this later sedimentary process. The result of this process in Legano was a moorland characterized by poor fertility due to a lack of humus and the presence of dry and stony soil.

With the arrival of humans, the soil was made fertile serviceable by the labor of farmers and the digging of irrigation channels such as acequia. Following these alterations, cultivated fields and forests spread over Legnano. The latter of these were made of plane, ash, common oak, hornbeam, chestnut, common hazel, poplar, elm, maple, and alder.

Etymology
The toponymy of the name "Legnano" is uncertain, as the early settlement was known by several names, but it is obvious that Legnano's name is older than that of the surrounding municipalities. "Legnano" could have originated as a predial adjective, formed from the name of the most prominent landowner in the area. In Legnano's case, this landowner's name could have been Lemennius or Limenius, to which was adjoined the suffix -anum. This would confirm the complete Latinization of the Legnano area; in other places where Celtic influence was still substantial, the suffix -acum would have been used. Thus, Lemoniano , Leminiano or Lemegniano , later to become Limnianum and finally Legnanum.

Another theory advances that one of the names that Legnano was known by in the Middle Ages, Ledegnanum, derives from the name for the region, Latinanium. Therefore, any suppositions linking the name of the city to the Celtic toponym Lemonianum ("place of the sacred grove") or the predial adjective Laenianum, referring to a potential landowner named Laenius are false.

Prehistory

The very earliest settlers in the Legnano area lived at a distance from the Olona so that its frequent flooding would not impair them. The most important archaeological finds in the area from before the Roman period were discovered in the slopes of the Olona valley. Excavations in this area uncovered numerous necropoli, usually bedecked with everyday items as grave goods. These early inhabitants are thought to have come from the  site or from other stilt house cultures on the Varese lakes.

The oldest man-made find was made by Guido Sutermeister during excavations between 1926 and 1928 in the Legnanese, alongside miscellaneous Roman finds. The item, a fragment of a bell-shaped vase (pictured), made by the Remedello culture between 3400 BC to 2200 BC. Although the nature of the relationship between the peoples along the Olona and the Remedello culture are unknown, it has been assumed they had commercial links.

In the area of Legnano are found no traces of the early Bronze Age; there have been no finds made dated to between 2200 BC and 1400 BC. The next chronological find is from 800 years after the synthesis of the Remedello fragment, attributed to the Canegrate culture. Investigatory excavations found some 200 tombs, dated to the 13th century BC, and other finds that showed development until the Iron Age. Having been discovered in nearby Canegrate, these finds are definite evidence of prehistoric peoples in the area of present-day Legnano.

In the 1980s,  dwellings dated from the 12th to the 10th centuries BC were discovered between Legnano and Castellanza. Archaeologists conjectured that these dwellings had stone foundations, wooden walls, and roofs made of several layers of dried leaves. Various household items were also discovered in these dwellings.

Two bronze spearheads dated to the 9th and 8th centuries BC were discovered in 1892 and 1895 near Legnano. They have been attributed to the Golasecca culture. More Golasecca finds, this time household items, were discovered in 1925 and 1937 and were dated to the 5th and 4th centuries BC. In the course of these excavations, two more necropoli were unearthed that contained yet more household goods as well as funerary urns.

Pre-Roman population
An excavation along the  uncovered two bronze items of the Celtic La Tène culture dated to between the 4th and 1st centuries BC. Other digs, even on small-scale, have unearthed numerous items corresponding to this culture throughout the Alto Milanese. No finds connected to either the Etruscans or Adriatic Veneti have been made.

Roman Empire

The romanization of the Legnano area took place slowly, as the Empire allowed the locals to continue speaking their language, worship their own gods, and practice their culture.

In Roman times, the inhabitants of the Legnano area were part of a vicus, as evidenced by abundant archaeological finds. Those discoveries were generally of poor quality, suggesting that the Legnano vicus was inhabited by poor citizenry. This is contrasted by the finds in nearby Parabiago, especially the Parabiago Plate. The Legnano vicus findings also suggested an agricultural character, particularly farming, husbandry, and weaving. The finds date from the 1st century BC to the 4th century AD suggest that the vicus was continuously inhabited. Legnano experienced socio-economic decline with the rest of the Roman Empire in its twilight years. With the arrival of Christianity, the inhabitants of the vicus began to bury rather than cremate their dead.

With the arrival of the Romans, Legnano became permanently inhabited by humans.

Archaeological finds
Archaeological evidence of Roman activity in Legnano is plentiful, beginning in the 2nd century BC with the Roman conquest of the region. From the amount and type of goods found in the middle Olona valley, it has been assumed that it was part of an important route of communication.

Numerous excavations in the 19th and 20th centuries found numerous Roman furnishings distributed evenly through the vicus. Among the items found, and now displayed at the Sutermeister Civic Museum, are portions of walls, teracotta piping, tiles, and bricks, necropoli, and household ceramic, glass, and metal objects, and currency.

The most important finds were made in 1925–26 between the Via Venegoni and the Via Firenze. These are coins, plates and cups, unguentaria, mirrors, and iron tools in a graveyard. The coins dated these finds to the reigns of Augustus and Caligula, or the 1st centuries BC and AD. Another dig in this same place in 1997 discovered goods from the 2nd and 4th centuries AD. Another 36 graves were discovered along the Via Micca that consisted to more of the same finds, albeit from the 1st and 2nd centuries AD. More tombs, from the reigns of Licinius and Constantine, were discovered along with their myriad grave goods. Other notable finds from the late antiquity include more coins and some amphorae from the 4th century AD.

Middle Ages

With the Migration Period the remaining territories of the Western Roman Empire experienced socio-economic implosion. Among the Germanic peoples migrating into the Roman Empire were the Lombards, who came the dominate Cisalpine Gaul. Their influence, and especially that of their dialect, was to be lasting; legnanese schirpa, a 19th-century term for a dowry, is Lombard in origin. Excavations in the municipal area have at various times revealed Lombard items from the 7th century. Swords and a shield boss were found on the Corso Giuseppe Garibaldi in 1894, a tomb was found in an adjacent area in 1926, and in 1950–51 household items were found near the INA Gallery.

Charlemagne preserved the structure of the Kingdom of the Lombards after defeating it, but replaced the native rulers with Franks.

See also

 History of Milan
 Legnano

Citations

References

 
 
 
 
 
 
 
 
 
 
 
 
 

Legnano
Legnano
Legnano